Linn Gossé (born 25 June 1986) is a Norwegian handball player. She currently plays for Tertnes HE.

She made her debut on the Norwegian national team back in 2005 and played two matches that year.

She was back on the national team in 2012, but later lost her position on the team to Sanna Solberg-Isaksen.

Achievements
European Championship:
Silver Medalist: 2012

Individual awards
 All-Star Left Wing of Postenligaen 2013/2014
 All-Star Left Wing of Postenligaen 2012/2013
 Topscorer of Postenligaen 2011/2012 (127 goals)
 All-Star Left Wing of Postenligaen 2011/2012
 Most Valuable Player of Postenligaen 2011/2012
 All-Star Left Wing of Postenligaen 2010/2011

References

External links
 

1986 births
Living people
People from Asker
Norwegian female handball players
Norwegian expatriate sportspeople in Denmark
Expatriate handball players
Sportspeople from Viken (county)